Amblyomma javanense is a hard-bodied tick of the genus Amblyomma. It is found in Vietnam, Indonesia, Malaysia, India, Sri Lanka, Philippines and Thailand. It is the only ectoparasite found on the Manis javanica, Manis crassicaudata and also from Sus scrofa.

References

External links 
 Occurrence of Amblyomma Javanense (Supino, 1897) (Ixodoidea: Ixodidae) in the Kyasanur Forest Disease Area, Shimoga District, Mysore State, India

Amblyomma
Animals described in 1897